William Nicholas Vander Zalm (born Wilhelmus Nicholaas Theodore Marie van der Zalm; May 29, 1934) is a politician and entrepreneur in British Columbia, Canada. He was the 28th premier of British Columbia from 1986 to 1991.

Early life
Wilhelmus Nicholaas Theodore Marie van der Zalm was born and raised in Noordwijkerhout, Netherlands. He emigrated to Canada after World War II, settling in the Fraser Valley in 1947. After completing high school, he sold tulip bulbs and ultimately established himself in the nursery and gardening business.

Early political career
Vander Zalm was elected an alderman of Surrey in 1965 and served as the city's mayor from 1969 to 1975. His tenure was marked by his crackdown on welfare "deadbeats" (until the early 1970s, welfare in BC was a municipal responsibility).

Vander Zalm was originally a supporter of both the Liberal Party of Canada and the BC Liberal Party. He sought election to the House of Commons of Canada in the 1968 federal election as a Liberal in Surrey. He lost by 4,445 votes. He was also a candidate at the 1972 provincial Liberal leadership convention, where he lost to David Anderson. He joined the BC Social Credit Party in 1974.

Social Credit MLA
Vander Zalm was first elected to the Legislative Assembly of British Columbia in the 1975 election for the riding of Surrey (he would later represent Richmond after the 1986 election). The Socreds won back power after a three-year hiatus.

He served in the cabinet of Premier Bill Bennett as minister of human resources from 1975 to 1978, where he continued his crusade against welfare fraud.

On June 22, 1978, the Victoria Daily Times published a political cartoon by Bob Bierman that portrayed the Minister of Human Resources as a grinning sadist, deliberately pulling the wings off flies. Vander Zalm launched legal action for libel, Vander Zalm v. Times Publishers. Justice Craig Munroe of the BC Supreme Court awarded Vander Zalm $3,500 in damages. The decision was overturned by the BC Court of Appeal in 1980, which was praised by journalists as a victory for free speech. The original cartoon was purchased by the National Archives of Canada for $350.

Vander Zalm also served as Minister of Municipal Affairs and Transit from 1978 to 1981 and as Minister of Education from 1981 to 1983.

In 1983, Vander Zalm, as minister of education, personally intervened in the Smithers school board to suspend Madeleine Sauve without pay. Madeleine Sauve distributed, without the permission of either parents or the local school board, a questionnaire concerning "mutual masturbation, oral sex, use of pornography and prostitution" to a class of Grade 8 students in Smithers.

In 1984, he bought Fantasy Garden World, a theme park. The same year, he ran unsuccessfully for mayor of Vancouver for the candidate for the Non-Partisan Association. He lost to Mike Harcourt, who was later the provincial NDP leader during most of Vander Zalm's tenure as premier.

Premier

In 1986, Premier Bennett announced he was retiring. Vander Zalm attracted considerable attention as he considered whether he would run for the leadership of the Social Credit Party. He generated more press from the race than the other candidates did. At the party's convention in Whistler, British Columbia, he prevailed over 11 other candidates by winning on the fourth ballot.

He was sworn in as premier just a month before the 1986 election. During the subsequent provincial election campaign, "Vandermania" swept BC, and the Socreds easily won another term over the opposition New Democratic Party (NDP).

Vander Zalm promised a fresh start after the confrontational Bennett years. Once elected in his own right, Vander Zalm filled most of the cabinet slots with MLAs who had languished on the backbench under Bennett. Vander Zalm decided to release the normally-secret list of cabinet appointments to two Vancouver Sun reporters hours before the official announcement was to be made.

On July 7, 1987, during the first session of the 34th Parliament, Vander Zalm's health minister Peter Dueck introduced the Health Statutes Amendment Act (Bill 34). This bill specified quarantine procedures for individuals with “serious reportable communicable disease." The bill was met with serious backlash and protest from HIV/AIDS activism groups like ACT UP, the Vancouver Lesbian Connection, and the Vancouver Persons With AIDS Coalition. The mobilization by activists in protest of the bill led to the formation of the Coalition for Responsible Health Legislation (CRHL) by Vancouver-based AIDS activists that led several actions for protest, but also education like safer sex workshops focused on preventing HIV transmission. The bill received Royal Assent on December 17, 1987, and was passed into law. The protests continued, but effort from the BC Civil Liberties Association shifted to the modification of the bill, rather than discarding it completely.

The government of Premier Bill Vander Zalm refused to fund the 1990 Gay Games event in Vancouver, citing inappropriate usage of public resources.

In 1988, after the Supreme Court of Canada decision of R vs Morgentaler, the provinces were now expected to cover abortion. Vander Zalm, chose not to extend provincial medical coverage to abortion, citing that abortions were an elective procedure and not medically necessary.

Vander Zalm became embroiled in an alleged conflict of interest controversy over the sale of his Fantasy Gardens flower garden and theme park. The conflict of interest arose because the Taiwanese buyer, Tan Yu, was provided VIP treatment by members of the Vander Zalm Government prior to the sale. Adding fuel to the fire, Faye Leung, a Chinese-Canadian entrepreneur and the woman who brokered the deal, claimed that Vander Zalm was a "bad man" since the day she first met him and secretly recorded conversations she had with him, which were subsequently leaked to the media. Faye Leung, for her part in the affair would later be convicted of four counts of secret commissions over 100k, and one count of theft over 45k, and two counts of fraud in 1995 by the BC Court of Appeals.

Vander Zalm resigned in 1991 after a provincial conflict of interest report by Ted Hughes, found that he had mixed private business with his public office in the sale of the Gardens. He was charged with criminal breach of trust, but was acquitted in BC Supreme Court in 1992. The judge ruled that Vander Zalm had acted in a manner that was "foolish, ill-advised and in apparent or real conflict of interest or breach of ethics", but that the prosecution had not proved its case beyond a reasonable doubt. It was revealed that during the sale of Fantasy Gardens, Vander Zalm had accepted $20,000 payment in cash from Tan Yu, the buyer of Fantasy Gardens, to which Vander Zalm said he took "for innocent reasons relating to travel and expenses incurred."

Vander Zalm was succeeded as premier by Deputy Premier Rita Johnston, who defeated McCarthy in the race to replace him as Socred leader. Contrary to popular belief that the party would thrive under new leadership, Social Credit collapsed and finished a distant third with the NDP returning to government and the Liberals becoming official opposition. The Social Credit Party were completely shut out of the legislature in the subsequent 1996 election and never again won seats.

Later career

Leadership of British Columbia Reform Party
Vander Zalm returned to politics in November 1999 when he was acclaimed as leader of the Reform Party of British Columbia.

Shortly after, he ran for office by running in a December 1999 by-election in Delta South, but finished second, with 32.91% of the vote behind BC Liberal Party candidate Val Roddick, who received 59.63%, with the governing NDP finishing in a distant fourth place with just 2.44%, their worst showing ever.

He attempted to orchestrate a merger of the Reform Party with other right-wing parties, but ran into stiff opposition. Vander Zalm and supporters within the party would later merge with several other small right-wing parties to form the British Columbia Unity Party. The Reform Party was de-registered as a BC political party in 2001 and Vander Zalm retired from politics. He now lives in Ladner.

Successful campaign against HST
Vander Zalm returned to the political spotlight in 2009, alongside Bill Tieleman, as a recurring critic of the provincial government's conversion of the Provincial Sales Tax to the Harmonized Sales Tax (HST). A series of populist rallies led to him becoming the official proponent, in accordance with the Recall and Initiative Act, of a petition seeking a referendum to cancel the HST. Vander Zalm established a website, FightHST, to promote the initiative. The provincial Liberal government countered Vander Zalm's campaign and devoted a section of their website to the positive aspects of the HST.

For the petition to be certified, there was a requirement to secure the signatures of a minimum of 10% of all registered voters on the provincial voters list in each riding in the province, no later than June 30, 2010.

On June 30, 2010, Vander Zalm delivered 85 boxes containing 705,643 signatures from voters in every riding across the province. Those signatures represented some 45% of votes cast in the 2009 provincial election.

On August 11, 2010, Elections BC verified the official anti-HST petition submitted by the province's Fight HST campaign.

Vander Zalm said he was pleased with the result, but "very disappointed" to learn the province's chief electoral officer would not act on the petition until all court proceedings involving the tax were complete. The anti-HST campaign turned its attention to a recall campaign for Liberal MLAs. Vander Zalm told reporters. "We will recall every Liberal MLA in the province, if that's what it takes." However, the initial attempts at recalls were unsuccessful.

On August 20, 2010, Chief Justice Robert J. Bauman ruled that the petition was valid. Bauman said Elections BC was correct when it approved the petition on August 11.

On September 14, 2010, it was announced a referendum would be held September 24, 2011 on repealing the HST. Premier Gordon Campbell stated a simple majority (50%+1) of those eligible and casting ballots would be sufficient for the government to cancel the HST if the referendum went against the government.

Elections BC conducted the referendum via mail-in ballot. The 2011 British Columbia sales tax referendum was conducted throughout June and July 2011.

The Question on the ballot was: Are you in favour of extinguishing the HST (Harmonized Sales Tax) and reinstating the PST (Provincial Sales Tax) in conjunction with the GST (Goods and Services Tax)? Yes or No 

On August 26, 2011, Elections BC revealed the results of the referendum: 55% of 1.6 million voters in favour of abolishing the HST. The BC Liberals revealed a plan to re-instate the GST/PST system within 18 months, with a target date of March 31, 2013.

2012 defamation suit
In 2012, a BC Supreme Court judge and jury heard a defamation lawsuit lodged against Vander Zalm by retired conflict-of-interest commissioner Ted Hughes. The former judge and Officer of the Order of Canada alleged that he had been defamed in Vander Zalm's 2008 self-published autobiography, For The People. The book suggested that Hughes, then in an interim appointment, may have conducted an unfair inquiry of Vander Zalm in 1991 by the prospect of achieving a permanent employment.

Vander Zalm defended the statements about Hughes, saying they had been fair comments, not facts, and that they had been made as a matter of public interest.

References

Further reading
Alan Twigg (1986). Vander Zalm: From Immigrant to Premier. Harbour Publishing. 
Gary Mason and Keith Baldrey (1989). Fantasyland: Inside the reign of Bill Vander Zalm. McGraw-Hill Ryerson. 
Steve Osborne and Mary Schendlinger (1989). Quotations from Chairman Zalm. Arsenal Pulp Press. 
Stan Persky (1989) Fantasy Government: Bill Vander Zalm and the Future of Social Credit. New Star Books. 
Graham Leslie (1991). Breach of Promise: Socred Ethics Under Vander Zalm. Harbour Publishing. 
Bill Vander Zalm (2008). For The People: Hindsight - Insight - Foresight: The Autobiography of British Columbia's 28th Premier. ASIN B0047I49ZS

External links
CBC Archival footage of "Vander Zalm's Kingdom" from "The Journal"
David Ingram interviews Bill Vander Zalm about his past including during World War II

1934 births
21st-century Canadian politicians
Living people
British Columbia Liberal Party candidates in British Columbia provincial elections
British Columbia Social Credit Party leaders
British Columbia Social Credit Party MLAs
Canadian Roman Catholics
Candidates in the 1968 Canadian federal election
Dutch emigrants to Canada
Liberal Party of Canada candidates for the Canadian House of Commons
Mayors of Surrey, British Columbia
Members of the Executive Council of British Columbia
People from Noordwijkerhout
People from Richmond, British Columbia
Premiers of British Columbia
Reform Party of British Columbia politicians